This is a list of defunct glassmaking companies, which are no longer in business.

Defunct glassmaking companies

  Alexander Gibbs 
  Bakewell Glass 
  Belmont Glass Company 
  Boston and Sandwich Glass Company 
  Cambridge Glass 
  Carr Lowrey Glass Company 
  Chance Brothers 
  Chandos Glass Cone 
  Cheshire Crown Glass Company 
  Clayton and Bell 
  Crystal City, Missouri 
  Dugan Glass Company 
  Dunbar Glass 
  Duncan & Miller Glass Company 
  Earley and Company 
  Edward Ford Plate Glass Company
  Fenton Glass Company
  Fostoria Glass Company 
  General Glass Industries 
  Grönvik glasbruk
  Hartford City Glass Company 
  Hazel-Atlas Glass Company 
  Heisey Glass Company 
  Helio (Cambridge Glass) 
  Hemingray Glass Company 
  Indiana Glass Company
  J. H. Hobbs, Brockunier and Company 
  James Powell and Sons 
  Jersey Glass Company 
  Knox Glass Bottle Company 
  Lavers, Barraud and Westlake 
  Macbeth-Evans Glass Company 
  Manufacture royale de glaces de miroirs 
  Millersburg Glass Company
  Morris & Co. 
  Nailsea Glassworks 
  New England Glass Company 
  New England Glassworks 
  New Geneva Glass Works 
  Northwood Glass Company 
  Novelty Glass Company 
  Old Dominion Glass Company 
  Pittsburgh Plate Glass Enamel Plant 
  Ravenhead glass 
  The Root Glass Company 
  Seneca Glass Company – was once the largest manufacturer of tumblers (drinking glasses) in the United States. See also: Seneca Glass Company Building.
  Sneath Glass Company 
  Stevens & Williams 
  Union Glass Company 
  W. F. Clokey of Belfast 
  Ward & Company of London 
  Ward & Partners of Belfast 
  Westmoreland Glass Company 
  Whitall Tatum Company 
  White Glass Company 
  Whitefriars Glass 
  Wistarburgh Glass Works
  Worshipful Company of Glaziers and Painters of GlassThis Livery company is still going strong, and operates rom its Hall in Southwark London.Please correct and ellete entry!

See also

 Lists of companies – company-related list articles on Wikipedia

References

 
Glassmaking